Kama Rathod is a Member of Legislative assembly from Viramgam constituency in Gujarat for its 12th legislative assembly.

References

Bharatiya Janata Party politicians from Gujarat
Living people
Gujarat MLAs 2007–2012
Year of birth missing (living people)